Viktor Viktorovich Sakharov (20 July 1848 in Moscow – 22 November 1905 in Saratov) was a Russian lieutenant general and Imperial Minister of War (1904–1905).

Biography 
Sakharov was a graduate of the Nicholas Academy of the General Staff and served in the Russo-Turkish War (1877-1878). He was subsequently named Assistant Chief of Staff of the Warsaw Military District, then Quartermaster General of the Warsaw Military District, and then Chief of Staff of the Odessa Military District. In 1898, Sakharov became Chief of the General Staff of the Imperial Russian Army.

In early 1904, after the beginning of the Russo-Japanese War, Sakharov succeeded Aleksey Kuropatkin as a Minister of War, when Kuropatkin was appointed commander-in-chief of the Russian land forces in Manchuria. Sakharov remained in St Petersburg throughout the war, and had little influence on the strategy or tactics of the conflict. He was dismissed from this post by Tsar Nicholas II on 21 June 1905 and replaced by Lieutenant General Aleksandr Rediger on 4 July 1905.
In late 1905, Sakharov was sent to Saratov Province to restore order during agrarian disturbances. On 22 November 1905, he was mortally shot by the SR woman terrorist Anastasia Bitsenko in the house of the Saratov governor Pyotr Stolypin.

His brother Vladimir Viktorovich Sakharov was also a general in the Imperial Russian Army.

Awards
 Order of St. Stanislaus  3rd degree
 Order of St. Anne, 3rd degree with swords (1877)
 Order of St. Stanislaus  2nd degree with swords (1877)
 Order of St. Anne, 2nd degree with swords (1878)
 Order of St Vladimir 4th degree, with swords (1878)
 Order of St Vladimir 3rd degree, with swords (1884)
 Order of St. Stanislaus  1st degree (1893)
 Order of St. Anne, 1st degree (1896)
 Order of St Vladimir 2nd degree, (1901)
Order of the Cross of Takovo, (1901) (Kingdom of Serbia)
Sword with order of the St.George 4th degree and diamonds (1905)

References

External links
 V.I. Gurko. Features And Figures Of The Past. Government And Opinion In The Reign Of Nicholas II.

Notes

1848 births
1905 deaths
Imperial Russian Army generals
Members of the State Council (Russian Empire)
People murdered in Russia
Assassinated Russian people
Deaths by firearm in Russia
Recipients of the Order of the Cross of Takovo
Russian military personnel of the Russo-Turkish War (1877–1878)
Russian military personnel of the Russo-Japanese War